Searsia glauca (or the blue kuni-rhus) is a small, compact tree or bush that is commonly found along the coastline of southern Africa. Although commonest near the coast, it is also found inland among fynbos vegetation.

Description

The leaves are characteristically glossy/shiny and often a slightly glaucous (blue-green) colour.  The leaves are trifoliate, with three obtuse (obcordate-cuneate) leaflets.

It is dioecious, with male and female flowers on separate plants. The fruits reach a maximum diameter of 5 mm (distinguishing it from Searsia undulata which has 3mm fruits).

Distribution
This species occurs along the coast of South Africa, as well as in certain areas inland. 
It occurs from Velddrif and Cape Town in the west, eastwards into the Eastern Cape Province.

Inland it occurs in the Little Karoo, around Worcester, Oudtshoorn, Baviaanskloof and northwards into Zimbabwe.

References

glauca
Endemic flora of South Africa
Flora of the Cape Provinces
Fynbos
Trees of South Africa
Dioecious plants